ExpoRail (currently not in operation according to its official Facebook page) was a train service provider in Sri Lanka. ExpoRail used to provide premium services on several routes in Sri Lanka, in partnership with Sri Lanka Railways.  Although it did not operate its own trains for scheduled services, it operated carriages that were attached to trains operated by Sri Lanka Railways.  ExpoRail also offered charter services, where entire trains are composed of its own carriages.

In February 2012, Lanka Business Today noted that ExpoRail is the fastest growing luxury train service provider in Sri Lanka.

As of September, 2017, ExpoRail is no longer operational. The official website displays the following messageExpo Rail operations have been cancelled until further notice due to a delay in Sri Lanka Railways finalizing the agreement & tender.

Overview
Although ExpoRail carriages are attached to Sri Lanka Railways-operated trains, ExpoRail provides on-board services and markets it as a separate operation.  The service is aimed at middle and upper middle-income and tourist markets.

Sri Lanka Railways generates revenue by charging ExpoRail a standard first-class fare per seat.  ExpoRail charges an additional premium on its passengers to provide its services.

History 
ExpoRail launched its first service on a Kandy intercity train on October 1, 2011.  Transport Minister Kumar Welgama and Deputy Minister Rohana Dissanayake were present at the launch.  On the same day, a competing service was launched by Blue Line Company, the Rajadhani Express.

On December 10, 2011, it added Badulla services and began services to Vavuniya on January 31, 2012.  As of February 2012, it is the fastest growing luxury train service provider in Sri Lanka.

In ExpoRail's first year of service, 44,500 passengers had travelled on their services.

Services 
ExpoRail serves four routes, on three major rail lines in Sri Lanka. Over 60 destinations are served.  ExpoRail also provides charter trains.

Rolling Stock 

ExpoRail uses Romanian-built ASTRA passenger coaches which are 30 years old.  Imported by Sri Lanka Railways in the 1980, they were refurbished with state-of-the-art interiors in 2011–2012.

During the refurbishment, the carriages were fitted with air-conditioning.  They were also given carpeting, first-class toilet facilities, Wi-Fi, LCD TVs, and side racks to store passenger luggage. Sri Lankan architectural firm KWA Architects prepared the interior designs.

Livery 
Each ExpoRail carriage has a unique livery.  The liveries used are typically brightly coloured.  Local advertising agency, Trumps Solutions, was responsible for the livery designs.

See also 
Expolanka, ExpoRail's parent company
 Rajadhani Express, ExpoRail's main competitor, serving a similar niche market

References 

Railway companies of Sri Lanka
Transport companies of Sri Lanka